A Change Of Scenery is an album by the  Maryland-based progressive bluegrass band The Seldom Scene. It is the first album with vocalist/guitarist Lou Reid and bassist T. Michael Coleman.

Track listing

Personnel 
 Lou Reid – vocals, guitar, fiddle
 John Duffey – mandolin, vocals
 Ben Eldridge – banjo
 Mike Auldridge – Dobro, vocals
 T. Michael Coleman – bass, vocals

with
 Robbie Magruder – percussion

References

External links 
 Official site

–

1986 albums
The Seldom Scene albums
Sugar Hill Records albums